Thor Peak may refer to:

 Mount Thor, Nunavut, Canada
 Thor Peak (California)
 Thor Peak (Wyoming)